Sheyla Guadalupe Flores Rivas (born 15 May 1998) is a Nicaraguan footballer who plays as a forward for Deportivo Saprissa and the Nicaragua women's national team.

Club career

In 2015, the 17-year-old Flores set a Nicaraguan women's football record, scoring a total of 72 goals for UNAN Managua across the 2014 Apertura and 2015 Clausura, surpassing Ninoska Solís's previous record of 66 goals.

In 2016, Flores signed with FC Águilas de León.

In October 2018, Flores signed with Salvadoran team Alianza F.C., becoming the first foreign footballer to play in Liga Mayor de Fútbol Femenina. She ended the regular season with 20 goals from 7 games.

In 2019, Flores rejoined UNAN Managua.

In January 2020, Flores signed with Costa Rican team Deportivo Saprissa. In July the same year, she returned to Nicaragua to join Real Estelí.

In April 2022, she rejoined Saprissa, signing alongside her younger sister Yessenia.

International career 

In 2011, a 13-year-old Flores played twice for the Nicaragua women's national under-17 football team, scoring in a 2–1 home loss to Panama.

International goals
Scores and results list Nicaragua's goal tally first

Personal life
Flores' sister Yessenia also plays for the Nicaragua women's national football team.

References 

1998 births
Living people
Nicaraguan women's footballers
Women's association football defenders
Alianza F.C. footballers
Nicaragua women's international footballers
Nicaraguan expatriate footballers
Nicaraguan expatriate sportspeople in El Salvador
Expatriate footballers in El Salvador